All I Can Be is the debut studio album by American country music artist Collin Raye. It features the hit singles "All I Can Be (Is a Sweet Memory)" (originally recorded by Conway Twitty as "All I Can Be Is a Sweet Memory" on his 1985 album Chasin' Rainbows), "Love, Me" (Raye's first #1 on the Billboard country charts), and "Every Second". The final track, "If I Were You", is a different song than the song of the same name recorded on Raye's 1994 album Extremes. "Any Ole Stretch of Blacktop" was later recorded by Shenandoah as a new track for their 1992 
Greatest Hits album.

Track listing

Personnel
Adapted from liner notes.

Acoustic guitar: Steve Gibson, Dean Parks, Fred Tackett, Billy Joe Walker Jr.
Background vocals: Beth Anderson, Vince Gill (track 1), Jerry Fuller, Herb Pederson (tracks 5 & 10), Harry Stinson, Dennis Wilson, Bubba Wray
Bass guitar: Dennis Belfield, Joe Chemay
Drums: Ron Krasinski, Paul Leim
Electric guitar: Steve Gibson, Kraig Hutchens, Dean Parks, Billy Joe Walker Jr., Reggie Young
Fiddle: Rob Hajacos
Lead vocals: Collin Raye
Keyboards: John Hobbs
Steel guitar: Paul Franklin, Jay Dee Maness

Production
Jerry Fuller, John Hobbs: Producers
Annette Fuller: Production Assistant
Gene Eichelberger, Brian Friedman: Engineering
Wally Traugott: Mastering

Chart performance

References

1991 debut albums
Collin Raye albums
Epic Records albums